The eleventh season of NYPD Blue premiered on ABC on September 23, 2003, and concluded on May 11, 2004.

Episodes

References

NYPD Blue seasons
2003 American television seasons
2004 American television seasons